Dissident is the second studio album by Deadline, released in 1991 by Day Eight Music.

Track listing

Personnel 
Musicians
Bootsy Collins – bass guitar
Aïyb Dieng – percussion
Jonas Hellborg – bass guitar, producer
Jens Johansson – keyboards
Bill Laswell – bass guitar, co-producer
Nicky Skopelitis – Fairlight CMI
Bernie Worrell – keyboards
Technical personnel
Oz Fritz – mixing, recording
Robert Musso – recording
Howie Weinberg – mastering

Release history

References

External links 
 

1991 albums
Deadline (band) albums
Albums produced by Bill Laswell